Toqto’a may refer to:
Toqta (died c. 1312), Khan of the Golden Horde
Toqto'a (Yuan Dynasty) (1314－1356), the grand councillor of the Yuan Dynasty